Waldemar Beck (14 March 1921 – 4 June 2014) was a German rower. He competed in the men's double sculls event at the 1952 Summer Olympics.

References

External links
 

1921 births
2014 deaths
German male rowers
Olympic rowers of Germany
Rowers at the 1952 Summer Olympics
Sportspeople from Fürth